Ray Whitzell (28 September 1940 – 26 April 2017) was an Australian rules footballer who played for the Footscray Football Club in the Victorian Football League (VFL).

References

External links

1940 births
2017 deaths
Australian rules footballers from Victoria (Australia)
Western Bulldogs players